Fred Albin (December 11, 1903 – May 3, 1968) was an American sound engineer. He was nominated for an Oscar for Best Special Effects on the film Gone with the Wind at the 12th Academy Awards. He also won the Academy Award for Technical Achievement that year along with Thomas T. Moulton and the Sound Department of the Samuel Goldwyn Studio for the origination and application of the Delta db test for sound recording in motion pictures.

References

External links

1903 births
1965 deaths
American audio engineers
Place of birth missing
Place of death missing
20th-century American engineers
Academy Award for Technical Achievement winners